Mahmoud Taha (born 1942) is a Jordanian artist, potter and ceramicist noted for integrating calligraphy into his ceramics and is regarded as the leading ceramicist in the Arab world.

Life and career
Mahmoud Taha was born in Jaffa in 1942. He studied at Baghdad Academy of Fine Arts where he received a Bachelor of Arts degree in 1968. He then went on to study calligraphy with the renowned calligrapher Mohammad Al-Hafez. He later continued his training in ceramics at Cardiff College of Arts in Wales, graduating in 1976. On his return to Jordan, he established a studio specialising in ceramics, ceramic sculpture and calligraphy.

In 1966, his arts professor, Kadhim Haydar, advised the young artist to use Arabic calligraphic elements in some of his works, since the professor had noticed Taha's talent for calligraphy. According to Taha, "this piece of advice opened the door to a new stage in my work, in which I experimented with the Kufic script of different historical periods... [and subsequently] Thuluth script and elements of Islamic ornamentation." He is also credited with improving the writing and calligraphy skills of many students in Jordanian schools.

He has been described as the "leading ceramicist in the Arab world." Taha became one of the first contemporary artists to use calligraphy as a graphic element in his work, and thus pioneered the Hurufiyah art movement which combines traditional art forms in innovative ways. His work has been described in the following terms; "Taha molds the clay of his native soil into full, smooth vessels that not only maintain an ancient tradition but also explores an innovative combination of textures, glazes and forms. In Taha's work, the viewer may trace the natural hues of his ancient heritage."

Work
Taha produces small ceramic discs or plates as well as very large murals. His ceramic work is featured in the permanent collection of the Jordan National Gallery of Fine Arts in Amman and in the Majida Mouasher Collection, a collection devoted to contemporary artworks.

Selected exhibitions
 The Right to Write, Jordan National Gallery, 1996 
 Contemporary Arab Artists, Darat Al Funun, 1997
 Pioneers of Jordan, Darat Al Funun, 1999
 Between Legend and Reality: Modern Art from the Arab World, Jordan National Art Gallery, 2002 
 Memory, Gallery of Cairo Amman Bank, 2008
 The Tenth Maqama: Paper, Clay & Memory IV, Nabad Art Gallery, 2012 (solo exhibition) 
 Mahmoud Taha: Ceramicist, Cairo Amman Bank, 2013  (solo exhibition)
 A Salute to Valantions, Orfali Gallery, Amman, 2013

Selected artworks

 Nostalgia for Jerusalem, glazed ceramic, 60 X 84 cm, 1987 
 The Matyr, ceramic plate, date unknown
 The Dome of the Rock,  date unknown
 Untitled Mural, 1999

See also

 Islamic art
 Islamic calligraphy
 Jordanian art
 List of Jordanians

References

Further reading

 Jonathan M. Bloom and Sheila S. Blair (eds), The Grove Encyclopedia of Islamic Art and Architecture, Volume 3, p. 363
 Sheila S. Blair, Islamic Calligraphy, Edinburgh University Press, 2006

External links
 "Memory" exhibition in Jordan alert to the risks of Judaizing Jerusalem - aljazeera in arabic
 
 Darat al Funun - News & Press Clips

1942 births
Palestinian artists
Living people
Muslim artists
Jordanian artists
Jordanian people of Palestinian descent